Stanley Green is a suburb of Poole, Dorset, England Stanley Green is north of Longfleet, and south of Oakdale.

Education 

 Stanley Green Infant Academy
 St Mary's RC Primary School

Amenities 
The suburb has its own public playground.

Politics 
Stanley Green is part of the Poole parliamentary constituency for elections to the House of Commons. It is currently represented by Conservative MP Robert Syms. Stanley Green is part of the Oakdale ward for elections to Bournemouth, Christchurch and Poole Council.

References 

Areas of Poole